Muribasidiospora is a genus of fungi in the Exobasidiaceae family. The genus contains four species that are found in India and Taiwan.

References

External links

Ustilaginomycotina